Simon Reid Curtis House, now known as the Boxwood Inn, is a historic home located in the Lee Hall neighborhood of Newport News, Virginia. It was built in 1897, and is a large, -story, Colonial Revival style frame combined store, post office, and dwelling. The building consists of two separate structures attached to form a "T" shaped building with common architectural features.  It was built by Simon Reid Curtis (1862–1949), a prominent businessman and land owner, who was an influential political leader in Warwick County, Virginia from the 1890s until his death in 1949. The Curtis family owned the house until 1996 when it was sold, renovated, and converted into a bed and breakfast.

It was listed on the National Register of Historic Places in 2009.

References

Bed and breakfasts in Virginia
Houses on the National Register of Historic Places in Virginia
Houses completed in 1897
Colonial Revival architecture in Virginia
Houses in Newport News, Virginia
National Register of Historic Places in Newport News, Virginia
1897 establishments in Virginia